Lunella moniliformis is a species of sea snail, a marine gastropod mollusk in the family Turbinidae, the turban snails.

This species is sometimes considered a synonym of Lunella granulata Gmelin, J.F., 1791

Description
The length of the shell varies between 20 mm and 25 mm.

Distribution
This marine species occurs off Vietnam.

Notes
Additional information regarding this species:
 Taxonomic status: Some authors place the name in the subgenus Turbo (Lunella)

References

 Dall, William Healey | Bolten, Joachim Friedrich,  An index to the Museum Boltenianum, 1915

External links
  To World Register of Marine Species

moniliformis
Gastropods described in 1798